Phocis  is one of the regional units of Greece. It is part of the administrative region of Central Greece. It stretches from the western mountainsides of Parnassus on the east to the mountain range of Vardousia on the west, upon the Gulf of Corinth. It is named after the ancient region of Phocis, but the modern regional unit also includes parts of ancient Aetolia, Locris and Doris.

Geography
Modern Phocis has an area of 2120 km² (819 mi²), of which 560 km² (216 mi²) are forested, 36 km² (14 mi²) are plains, and the remainder is mountainous. The massive ridge of Parnassus (2,459 m/8,068 ft), which traverses the heart of the country, divides it into two distinct portions. The neighbouring prefectures are Aetolia-Acarnania to the west, Phthiotis to the north and Boeotia to the east. It also shares a tiny border with Evrytania. Much of the south and east are deforested and rocky and mountainous while the valley runs from Itea up to Amfissa. Forests and green spaces are to the west, the central part and the north.

Its reservoir is the Mornos Dam on the Mornos river. It covers nearly 1 km to 3 km². It was completed in the 1960s, and GR-48 was extended to pass through the dam.

The roads of Phocis are:
Greek National Road 3, NE
Greek National Road 27, Cen., N
Greek National Road 48, SW, Cen., SE
E65, SW, S, SE

Administration

Prefecture
The prefecture of Phocis was formed in 1947 from the previous Phthiotis and Phocis Prefecture. As a part of the 2011 Kallikratis government reform, a new regional unit Phocis was formed from the 1947 prefecture Phocis without a change of territory.

Municipalities
In 2011 the regional unit Phocis was subdivided into 2 municipalities according to the table below.

Former provinces
The pre-2011 municipalities had been organized into two provinces:
Province of Dorida - Lidoriki
Province of Parnassida - Amfissa
These were abolished. Provinces no longer hold any legal status in Greece.

Demographics
Modern Phocis was inhabited by several Greek tribes since  antiquity, mainly by Phocians, Locrians and Dorians, which were intermingled and formed the present-day Phocian population, with a unique linguistic and cultural heritage, frequently mentioned as Roumeliotes.

Population statistics
With a population of 40,343 (2001), it is one of Greece's least populous regional units, and has a population density of 19 persons per km² (49/mi²). In the summer months, the population nearly doubles due to the influx of tourists.

Most of the villages are in the south, the southeast and the east, especially in the areas between Amfissa and Itea. The north and the west are the least populated.

Notable people
Alexander of Phocis
Giannis Skarimpas (September 28, 1893 in Agia Efthymia Parnassidos – January 21, 1984)
Nikolaos Makarezos (1919 – August 3, 2009)
Eleni Karaindrou

Sporting teams
Here are the most popular sporting teams in the prefecture.  All of the teams are under the Phocis Football Clubs Association in which it existed since 1985 after the separation and dissolution of the Phocis-Phtiotis Football Guild Union.

Androutsos Gravia - Gravia
Asteras Iteas - Itea
Doxa Desfina - Desfina
Isaia Desfina - Desfina
Diagoras Polydrosos - Polydrosos
Dorikos Nea Dorida - Nea Dorida
Fokikos - Amfissa
A.O. Malesina - Malesina

History

See also
List of settlements in Phocis

Attribution

References

External links

 
 
 

 
Prefectures of Greece
1899 establishments in Greece
Regional units of Central Greece